Resonant-cavity-enhanced photo detectors (or RCE photodetectors) are sensors of light or other electromagnetic radiation which use an optical cavity to more efficiently target specific wavelengths. With RCE photodetectors, the active device structure of a photodetectors is placed inside a Fabry–Pérot interferometer. The interferometer has two parallel surfaces between which selected wavelengths of light can be made to resonate, amplifying their optical field. Though the active device structure of the RCE detectors remains close to conventional photodetectors, the amplification effect of the optical cavity allows RCE photodetectors to be made thinner and therefore faster, while simultaneously increasing the quantum efficiency at the resonant wavelengths.

Advantages
The quantum efficiency of conventional detectors is dominated by the optical absorption (electromagnetic radiation) of the semiconductor material. For the semiconductors with low absorption coefficients, a thicker absorption region is required to achieve higher quantum efficiency, but at the cost of the signal-processing bandwidth of photodetectors.

A RCE detector improves the bandwidth significantly. The constructive interference of a Fabry–Pérot cavity enhances the optical field inside the photodetector at the resonance wavelengths to achieve a quantum efficiency of close to unity. Moreover, the optical cavity makes the RCE detectors wavelength selective. This makes RCE photodetectors attractive for low crosstalk wavelength demultiplexing. Improved quantum efficiency gives less power consumption. Higher bandwidth gives faster operation.

The RCE photodetectors have both wavelength selectivity and high-speed response making them ideal for wavelength division multiplexing applications. Optical modulators situated in an optical cavity require fewer quantum wells to absorb the same fraction of the incident light and can therefore operate at lower voltages. In the case of emitters, the cavity modifies the spontaneous emission of light-emitting diodes (LED) improving their spectral purity and directivity.

Thus, optical communication systems can perform much faster, with more bandwidth and can become more reliable. Camera sensors could give more resolutions, better contrast ratios and less distortion. For these reasons, RCE devices can be expected to play a growing role in optoelectronics over the coming years.

Theory of RCE photo detectors

Compared to a conventional photodiode, RCE photo detectors can provide higher quantum efficiency, a higher detection speed and can also provide wavelength selective detection.

Quantum efficiency of RCE photo detectors

The RCE photodetectors are expected to have higher quantum efficiency η than compared to conventional photodiodes. The formulation of η for RCE devices gives insight to the design criteria.

A generalized RCE photodetector schematic as given in Figure 1 can give the required theoretical model of photodetection. A thin absorption region of thickness d is sandwiched between two relatively less absorbing region, substrate, of thickness L1 and L2. The optical cavity is formed by a period of λ/4 distributed Bragg reflector (DBR), made of non-absorbing larger bandgap materials, at the end of the substrate. The front mirror has a transmittance of t1 and generally has lower reflectivity than compared to the mirror at back (R1 < R2 ). Transmittance t1 allows light to enter into the cavity, and reflectivity R1 (=r12) and R2 (=r22) provides the optical confinement in the cavity.

The active region and the substrate region have absorption coefficient α and αex respectively.

The optical microcavity allows building up an optical field inside the optical cavity. In compared to conventional detector, where light is absorbed in a single pass through the absorption region, for RCE detectors trapped light is absorbed each time it traverses through the absorption region.

The Quantum efficiency  for a RCE detector is given by:

Here αc = (αexL1 + αexL2 + αd)/L. In practical detector design αex << α, so αex can be neglected and  can be given as:

The term inside the [] represents the cavity enhancement effect. This is a periodic function of 2βL+ ф1 + ф2, which has minima at 2βL+ ф1 + ф2 = 2mп. And η enhanced periodically at resonance wavelength that meets this condition.  The spacing of the resonant wavelength is given by the Free Spectral Range of the cavity.

The peak value of η at resonant wavelength is given as:

for a thin active layer as αd<<1, η becomes:

This is a significant improvement from the quantum efficiency of a conventional photodetector which is given by:

.

This shows that higher quantum efficiency can be achieved for smaller absorption regions.

The critical design requirements are a very high back mirror reflectivity and a moderate absorption layer thickness. At optical frequencies, metal mirrors have low reflectivity (94%) when used on materials like GaAs. This makes metal mirrors inefficient for RCE detection. Whereas distributed Bragg reflector (DBR) can provide reflectivity near unity and are ideal choice for RCE structures.

For a R2=0.99 and α=104 cm-1 with a R1=0.2 a η of 0.99 or more can be achievable for d=0.7–0.95 µm. Similarly for different values of R1 very high η is possible to achieve. However, R1 =0 limits the length of thickness region, d>5 µm can achieve 0.99 η but at the cost of bandwidth.

Detection speed of RCE photodiodes
The detection speed depends upon the drift velocities of the electrons and holes. And between these two holes have slower drift velocity than the electrons. The transit time limited bandwidth of conventional p-i-n photodiode is given by:

However, the quantum efficiency is a function of L as:

.

For a high-speed detector for a small value of L, as α is very small, η becomes very small (η<<1). This shows for an optimum value of quantum efficiency the bandwidth has to sacrifice.

A p-i-n RCE photodetector can reduce the absorption region to a much smaller scale. In this case the carriers need to traverse a smaller distance as well, L1 (< L) and L2 (< L) for electrons and holes respectively.

The length of L1 and L2 can also be optimized to match the delay between the hole and electron drift. And the transition bandwidth becomes:

As in most of semiconductors  is more than  the bandwidth increases drastically.

It’s been reported that for a large device of L=0.5μm 64 GHz of bandwidth can be achieved and a small device of L=0.25μm can give 120 GHz bandwidth, whereas conventional photodetectors have a bandwidth of 10–30 GHz.

Wavelength selectivity of RCE photo detectors
An RCE structure can make the detector wavelength selective to an extent due to the resonance properties of the cavity. The resonance condition of the cavity is given as 2βL+ ф1 + ф2 = 2mп. For any other value the efficiency η reduces from its maximum value, and vanishes when 2βL+ ф1 + ф2 = (2m+1)п. The wavelength spacing of the maxima of η is separated by the Free Spectral Range of the cavity, given as:

Where neff is the effective refractive index and Leff,i  are the effective optical path lengths of the mirrors.

Finesse, the ratio of the FSR to the FWHM at the resonant wavelength, gives the wavelength selectivity of the cavity.

This shows that the wavelength selectivity increases with higher reflectivity and smaller values of L.

Material requirements for RCE devices
The estimated superior performance of the RCE devices critically depends on the realization of a very low loss active region. This enforces the conditions that: the mirror and the cavity materials must be non-absorbing at the detection wavelength, and the mirror should have very high reflectivity so that it gives the highest optical confinement inside the cavity.

The absorption in the cavity can be limited by making the bandgap of the active region smaller than the cavity and the mirror. But a large difference in the bandgap would be a blockage in the extraction of photo-generated carriers from a heterojunction. Usually, a moderate offset is kept within the absorption spectrum.

Different material combinations satisfy all of the above criteria and are therefore used in the RCE scheme. Some material combinations used for RCE detection are:

1.GaAs(M,C) / AlGaAs(M) / InGaAs(A)  near 830-920nm.
2.InP(C) / In0.53Ga0.47As(M) / In0.52Al0.48As(M) / In0.53–0.7GaAs(A) near 1550nm.
3.GaAs(M,C) / AlAs(M) / Ge(A) near 830-920nm.
4.Si(M,C) / SiGe(M) / Ge(A) near 1550nm.
5.GaP(M) / AlP(M) / Si(A,S) near visible region.

Future of RCE photodiodes
There are many examples of RCE devices such as the p-i-n photodiode, avalanche photodiode and schottky diode that verifies the theory successfully. Some of them are already in use today, while there are future use cases such as modulators, and optical logics in wavelength division multiplexing (WDM) systems which could enhance the quantum efficiency, operating bandwidth, and wavelength selectivity.

RCE detectors are preferable in potential price and performance in commercial WDM systems. RCE detectors have very good potential for implementation in WDM systems and improve performance significantly. There are various implementations of RCE modulators are made and there is a huge scope for further improvement in the performance of those. Other than the photodetectors the RCE structures have many other implementations and a very high potential for improved performance. A Light Emitting Diode (LED) can be made to have narrower spectrum and higher directivity to allow more coupling to optical fibre and better utilization of the fiber bandwidth. Optical amplifiers can be made to have more compact, thus lower power required to pump and also at a lower cost. Photonic logics will work more efficiently than they do. There will be much less crosstalk, more speed, and more gain with simple design.

See also
PIN diode
schottky diode
Avalanche photodiode
Wavelength selective switching
Photonic integrated circuit
Semiconductor material
Fabry–Pérot interferometer
Fresnel equations
Resonance
Optical cavity
Photoelectric effect

References
[1] Goedbloed and Joosten; " Thin Silicon Film p-i-n Photodiodes with Internal Reflection";  IEEE Journal of Solid-State Circuits,  173 – 179 ,Volume: 13 Issue: 1, Feb (1978).

[2] R G Hunsperger, Integrated Optics: Theory and Technology ispringer, New York, (1991).

[3] M. Selim Unlu, Samuel Strite; "Resonant cavity enhanced photonic devices"; J. Appl. Phys. 78, 607 (1995).

[4] K. Kishino. M. S. Unlu, J. I. Chyi, J. Reed, L. Arsenault, and H. Morkoc; " Resonant Cavity Enhanced Photodetectors", IEEE J. Quantum Electron. 27, 2025 (1991).

[5] A. G. Dentai, R. Kuchibohlta, I. C. Campbell, C. Tsai, C. Lei; "HIGH QUANTUM EFFICIENCY, LONG WAVELENGTH InP/lnGaAs MICROCAVITY PHOTODIODE", 7 November 1991 Vol. 27 No 23.

[6] Ravi Kuchibhotla , Joe C. Campbell, John C. Bean, Larry Peticolas, and Robert Hull; "Si0.8Ge0.2 /Si Bragg-reflector mirrors :for optoelectronic device applications" ; Appl. Phys. Lett. 62 (18), 3 May 1993.

[7] F. Y. Huangja) A. Salvador, X. Gui, N. Teraguchi, and H. Morkoq; "Resonant-cavity GaAs/lnGaAs/AIAs photodiodes with a:periodic absorber structure"; Appi. Phys. L&t. 63 (2), 12 July 1993.

[8] R. Kuchibhotla;   A. Srinivasan;   J.C. Campbell;   C. Lei;   D.G. Deppe;   Y.S. He;   B.G. Streetman;   "Low-voltage high-gain resonant-cavity avalanche photodiode"; 354 – 356, Volume: 3 Issue:4 ,  IEEE Photonics Technology Letters, April 1991.

[9] Li, Z.-M. Landheer, D. Veilleux, M. Conn, D.R. Surridge, R. Xu, J.M. McDonald; "Analysis of a resonant-cavity enhanced GaAs/AlGaAs MSM photodetector"; 473 – 476 , Volume :  4 ,  Issue:5, IEEE Photonics Technology Letters, May 1992.

[10]S. Unlu, K. Kishino, J. I. Chyi, L. Arsenault, J. Reed, and H. Morkoc; "Wavelength demultiplexing heterojunction phototransistor"; Electron. Lett. 26, 1857 (1990).

Photodetectors